Dipygus is a severe congenital deformity where the body axis forks left and right partway along the torso with the posterior end (pelvis and legs) duplicated.

Myrtle Corbin was a dipygus; she married and had five children. In human cases, the inner two of the four hindquarters develop much smaller than normal. This is a type of "teras catadidymum" ("monster twinned below"). Another sort of deformity with extra legs can happen from a degenerated conjoined twin, as may have happened with Frank Lentini with his third leg.

Signs 
Dipygus manifests as duplicated lower limbs and could include additional organs or bodily structures.

Causes 
Dipygus is caused by genetic, environmental, or teratogenic factors. It occurs early in intrauterine life.

References

Congenital disorders
Rare diseases
Parasitic twin